Jesús Gómez Cos (born 26 October 1968) is a Spanish football manager and former player.

Playing career

Cos was born in Maliaño in the municipality of Camargo, Cantabria, and began his career with Cantabrian Tercera División side Gimnástica de Torrelavega in 1988. After helping Gimnástica win their Tercera División group in 1989–90, he joined Laredo in the same division for the following season. He stepped up a tier to sign for Barakaldo in Segunda División B in 1992. In his only season with the club, he scored sixteen goals thirty four matches. He went on to play for a succession of clubs in the third tier, spending two seasons with Xerez, one with Numancia and two with Pontevedra before joining newly promoted Noja in 1998. Noja were relegated straight back to the Tercera División after just one season, and Cos stayed at the club until 2000. He added a second Tercera División group win in 1999–2000, before returning to Segunda División B with Tropezón. Tropezón were relegated that season, and Cos retired in 2001 at the age of 32.

Coaching career

After retiring, Cos became a coach at Palamós, managing the newly promoted Segunda División B side from the start of the 2002–03 season. Palamós were owned at the time by Dmitry Piterman, who went on to buy a 24% stake of La Liga club Racing Santander in January 2003. Piterman immediately decided to replace Santander coach Manuel Preciado, bringing in Cos in his place.

Santander avoided relegation that season, but Cos was replaced by Lucas Alcaraz before the 2003–04 campaign. Piterman's next investment was to buy a 51% stake in Segunda División side Deportivo Alavés in July 2004, and he again immediately appointed Cos as manager.

Cos guided Alavés to promotion in his first season in charge, and remained as manager for the first 18 matches of the 2005–06 La Liga campaign. In January, Piterman made Cos director of football, and appointed Juan Carlos Oliva as the new manager. Oliva was fired after just five games for insubordination, with Mario Luna taking over until the end of the season, when Alavés were relegated.

Alavés began the following season with yet another manager, Julio Bañuelos, but he too was sacked just two games into the campaign, with Cos then reappointed as manager. After six wins from seventeen matches, Cos was also fired in January 2007. Alavés went on to have six different managers that season, with Fabri González, José Garmendia, Mario Luna and Quique Yagüe all coaching the team at some stage.

Career statistics

Managerial statistics

Honours

Player
Gimnástica de Torrelavega
Tercera División: 1989–90

Noja
Tercera División: 1999–2000

References

External links

1968 births
Living people
People from Camargo, Cantabria
Footballers from Cantabria
Spanish footballers
Association football forwards
Segunda División B players
Tercera División players
Gimnástica de Torrelavega footballers
Barakaldo CF footballers
Xerez CD footballers
CD Numancia players
Pontevedra CF footballers
CD Tropezón players
Spanish football managers
La Liga managers
Segunda División managers
Segunda División B managers
Palamós CF managers
Racing de Santander managers
Deportivo Alavés managers